Julieanna Marie Goddard (born March 2, 1990), known professionally as YesJulz, is an American social-media personality, talent manager, and entrepreneur.

Early life

Julieanna Marie Goddard was born on March 2, 1990, in Miami, Florida, U.S. She is of Italian and Puerto Rican descent. She attended the University of South Florida and graduated with a bachelor's degree in broadcast journalism.

Career

YesJulz career began in Miami, Originally rising to prominence in 2014, after citing a Sprite Remix Party for LeBron James in Miami.
She dipped into artist management as she managed musician 070 Shake, an American rapper who was featured on Kanye West, Pusha T, and Nas' albums.
Media outlets have called Julieanna Goddard The Queen of Snapchat. Snapchat 'it' girl.
She started the YesJulz Agency in 2014. In 2015, YesJulz hosted 1AM party in LA, that featured artists including Lil Uzi Vert and Wiz Khalifa.
She was nominated for Snapchat storyteller on August 24, 2016, at the 6th Streamy Awards, the Awards honoring web television series at the Beverly Hilton in Beverly Hills, California.

Achievements

YesJulz is a brand influencer, an event producer, an A&R, a publicist, with a SnapChat following of an estimated 500,000+ viewers, She has partnered with brands such as Beats by Dre and Red Bull. YesJulz also sprint an all-female creative agency with clients including Puma and Vevo, as well as a radio station and music-management company.

Controversy

In 2017, "YesJulz" posted an image of a t-shirt on Twitter that stated "Ni**as Lie a Lot" and inquired if she should wear it to a festival. She had since deleted the tweet.

In 2019, "YesJulz" was filmed freestyling by Soulja Boy during which she stated  "…because my ass is fat and my skin ain't black, I'm the vulture that you're hunting. Yet they never do nothing, they never give back. They keep killing Blacks." as if to imply that Black people who criticize her for being a "culture vulture" don't give back to their communities and commit "Black on Black" crime.

References

Living people
1990 births